Thulani (meaning: the quiet one) is a South African given name that may refer to
Thulani Davis (born 1949), American playwright, journalist, librettist, novelist, poet, and screenwriter
Thulani Hlatshwayo (born 1989), South African football defender 
Thulani Malinga (born 1955), South African professional boxer 
Thulani Maseko, Swaziland human rights lawyer 
Thulani Ngcepe (born 1990), South African football striker 
Thulani Ngidi (born 1986), South African rugby union player
Thulani Serero (born 1990), South African football midfielder 
Thulani Shabalala (born 1968), South African singer